Mahal is an album by American jazz trumpeter Eddie Henderson recorded in 1978 which was his second album released on the Capitol label.

Reception
The Allmusic review by Richard S. Ginell states "more disco excursions for Capitol's A&R department and more listless themes for Henderson's horn to purvey, although his solo contributions are somewhat more involving this time".

Track listing
All compositions by Eddie Henderson except as indicated
 "Butterfly" (Herbie Hancock, Bennie Maupin) - 8:05
 "Cyclops" (James Mtume) - 5:18
 "Emotions" - 4:59
 "Prance On" (Mtume) - 5:16
 "Amoroso" (Benny Maupin) - 5:38
 "Mahal" - 4:27
 "Ecstasy" - 3:25

Personnel
Eddie Henderson - trumpet, flugelhorn
Hubert Laws - flute
Julian Priester - trombone 
Bennie Maupin - tenor saxophone, saxello
Herbie Hancock - electric piano, clavinet, synthesizer
Mtume - piano, congas
John Bowen - synthesizer, programming
Ray Obiedo - guitars
Paul Jackson - bass
Howard King - drums
Bill Summers - congas, percussion

References 

1978 albums
Capitol Records albums
Eddie Henderson (musician) albums
Albums recorded at Wally Heider Studios